In electromagnetism, electrostriction is a property of all electrical non-conductors, or dielectrics, that causes them to change their shape under the application of an electric field. It is the dual property to magnetostriction.

Explanation 
Electrostriction is a property of all dielectric materials, and is caused by displacement of ions in the crystal lattice upon being exposed to an external electric field. Positive ions will be displaced in the direction of the field, while negative ions will be displaced in the opposite direction. This displacement will accumulate throughout the bulk material and result in an overall strain (elongation) in the direction of the field. The thickness will be reduced in the orthogonal directions characterized by Poisson's ratio. All insulating materials consisting of more than one type of atom will be ionic to some extent due to the difference of electronegativity of the atoms, and therefore exhibit electrostriction.

The resulting strain (ratio of deformation to the original dimension) is proportional to the square of the polarization. Reversal of the electric field does not reverse the direction of the deformation.

More formally, the electrostriction coefficient is a fourth rank tensor, relating the second-order strain tensor and the first-order electric polarization density.

The related piezoelectric effect occurs only in a particular class of dielectrics.  Electrostriction applies to all crystal symmetries, while the piezoelectric effect only applies to the 20 piezoelectric point groups.  Electrostriction is a quadratic effect, unlike piezoelectricity, which is a linear effect.

Materials 
Although all dielectrics exhibit some electrostriction, certain engineered ceramics, known as relaxor ferroelectrics, have extraordinarily high electrostrictive constants.  The most commonly used are
 lead magnesium niobate (PMN)
 lead magnesium niobate-lead titanate (PMN-PT)
 lead lanthanum zirconate titanate (PLZT)

Magnitude of effect 

Electrostriction can produce a strain of 0.1% at a field strength of 2 million volts per meter (2 MV/m) for the material called PMN-15 (TRS website listed in the references below). The effect appears to be quadratic at low field strengths (up to 0.3 MV/m) and roughly linear after that, up to a maximum field strength of 4 MV/m . Therefore, devices made of such materials are normally operated around a bias voltage in order to behave nearly linearly. This will probably cause deformations to lead to a change of electric charge, but this is unconfirmed.

Applications 

 Sonar projectors for submarines and surface vessels
 Actuators for small displacements

See also 
 Magnetostriction
 Photoelasticity
 Piezomagnetism
 Piezoelectricity
 Relaxor ferroelectric

References
 "Electrostriction." Encyclopædia Britannica.
 Mini dictionary of physics (1988) Oxford University Press
 "Electrostrictive Materials" from TRS Technologies
 "Electronic Materials" by Prof. Dr. Helmut Föll

Materials science
Electric and magnetic fields in matter